This is a list of airlines which have Air Operator Certificates in Lithuania.

Charter airlines

Public service obligation

See also 
 List of airlines
 List of defunct airlines of Lithuania
 List of defunct airlines of Europe

 *
Lithuania
Airlines
Airlines
Lithuania